Crexa is a genus of moths in the family Lasiocampidae. The genus was erected by Francis Walker in 1866.

Species
Crexa acedesta Turner, 1911
Crexa dianipha Turner, 1911
Crexa epipasta Swinhoe
Crexa fola Swinhoe, 1902
Crexa hyaloessa Turner, 1902
Crexa macqueeni Turner, 1936
Crexa macroptila Turner, 1911
Crexa punctigera Walker, 1855
Crexa rhonda Swinhoe
Crexa subnotata Walker, 1869

External links

Lasiocampidae